Highway 825, Route 825, or State Road 825, may refer to:

Canada
  in Alberta

United States
  in Florida
  in Nevada
  in New York
  in Puerto Rico